The 2020–21 Reading F.C. Women season was the club's 14th season and their sixth in the FA Women's Super League, the highest level of the football pyramid. Reading finished the season in 7th place, were knocked out of the FA Cup in the fourth round and finished second in their League Cup group.

Season events
On 15 July, Reading announced the signing of Danielle Carter and Emma Mitchell from Arsenal.

On 17 July, Reading announced the signing of Deanna Cooper, who last played for Chelsea. On the same day, Reading announced new contracts for Natasha Harding, Kiera Skeels and Lily Woodham.

On 14 August, Reading announced the signing of Erin Nayler from Girondins de Bordeaux.

On 19 August, Jess Fishlock joined Reading on loan from OL Reign.

On 1 September, Reading were drawn in Group D of the League Cup alongside West Ham United, Charlton Athletic and Brighton & Hove Albion.

On 4 September, Reading announced the signing of Jeon Ga-eul.

On 8 January, midfielder Sophie Quirk moved to London Bees on loan for the remainder of the season.

On 6 February, Reading announced the signing of Silvana Flores. On 16 February, Grace Moloney extended her contract with Reading until the summer of 2023.

On 19 February, Reading confirmed that Jess Fishlock's loan from OL Reign would end on 4 April, with Brooke Chaplen extending her contract with the club until the summer of 2022 on 22 February.

On 26 March, Rachel Rowe extended her contract with Reading until June 2024.

On 26 April, Fara Williams announced that she would be retiring at the end of the season.

On 12 May, Reading announced that Molly Bartrip, Lauren Bruton, Kristine Leine, Erin Nayler, Silvana Flores and Molly Childerhouse would all be leaving the club, alongside Fara Williams and Angharad James, when their contracts expire at the end of the season.

Transfers

In

Loans in

Out

Loans out

Released

Squad

Out on loan

Competitions

WSL

Results summary

Results by matchday

Results

Table

FA Cup

League Cup

Group stage

Squad statistics

Appearances 

|-
|colspan="14"|Players away from the club on loan:
|-
|colspan="14"|Players who appeared for Reading but left during the season:

|}

Goal scorers

Clean sheets

Disciplinary record

References 

Reading